Ajnabi is an Indian drama series broadcast on  DD Metro channel. The serial's story and screenplay was written by acclaimed actor Danny Denzongpa. It was directed by Mohinder Batra and produced by Romesh Sharma.

The series was loosely based on the Nepali film Saino, written by Denzongpa and directed by his nephew Ugyen. The series comprised 75 episodes.

Denzongpa played an army official who retires and moves to Jammu and Kashmir. The series showed insurgency and terrorism in the state, the bravery of the armed forces and the emotional lives of everyone affected by the insurgency.

Cast

 Danny Denzongpa as Captain
 Parikshit Sahni
 Annu Kapoor
 Deep Dhillon as Passa
 Tinnu Anand
 Goga Kapoor
 Mahendra Sandhu
 Deepshikha Nagpal
 Jeet Upendra
 Amita Nangia
 Sooraj Thapar
 Gajendra Chauhan
 Ibteesam
 Arun Bakshi

References

External links 
 

DD Metro original programming
Indian Armed Forces in fiction
1993 Indian television series debuts
Television shows set in Jammu and Kashmir
Kashmir conflict in fiction